William Alexander Kilgour (2 February 1878 – 4 March 1935) was a New Zealand cricketer. He played four first-class matches for Otago between 1901 and 1908.

See also
 List of Otago representative cricketers

References

External links
 

1878 births
1935 deaths
New Zealand cricketers
Otago cricketers
Cricketers from Dunedin